WUIT-LP is a low-power FM station in Durham, North Carolina, United States. The station broadcasts on the FM frequency of 90.3 FM MHz. The station serves downtown Durham, and the fringe coverage area reaches to around the Raleigh-Durham International Airport (RDU). WUIT-LP began broadcasting on February 23, 2018.

References

External links
 

UIT-LP
Mass media in Durham, North Carolina
Radio stations established in 2018
2018 establishments in North Carolina
UIT-LP
UIT-LP